James Dougan Norris (November 6, 1906 – February 25, 1966) was an American sports businessman, with interests in boxing, ice hockey, and horse racing. He was the son of James E. Norris (whom the James Norris Memorial Trophy is named after) and half-brother of Bruce Norris and Marguerite Norris. He is a member of the Hockey Hall of Fame.

Biography
Born in Chicago, Norris served as a lieutenant with the United States Navy during World War II. In business, he was a partner in the commodity brokerage firm, Norris and Kenly, and became involved in hockey by working for his father, who bought the Detroit Red Wings in 1932. In 1946, James D. Norris was one of a group that purchased the Chicago Blackhawks along with Bill Tobin (left Chicago Blackhawks in 1954) and Arthur M. Wirtz Sr.  However, he remained a Vice President with the Detroit Red Wings until the summer of 1952.  That summer He left to help Arthur M. Wirtz Sr. run the Chicago Black Hawks.  In 1957, James Norris along with his half brother Bruce Norris and other NHL owners of the time, were accused of union busting activities related to the attempt by Ted Lindsay and a group of NHL players to form an NHL Players Association.  Mr. Norris' role in those affairs are dramatized in the movie Net Worth.

The Blackhawks won the Stanley Cup in 1961, with Norris as chairman. Norris was elected to the Hockey Hall of Fame in 1962.

Norris' father passed along several of the family's businesses to him in the late 1940s, including a significant ownership position in Norris Grain Company and Madison Square Garden.

Norris was president of the International Boxing Club of New York from 1949 to 1958. The IBC dominated boxing in the U.S. in the 1950s, but was dissolved by the courts, which ruled it to be a monopoly. As president of the IBC, Norris was involved with organized crime figures. Norris was responsible for fixing numerous bouts. Besides match fixing, he was also unofficially managing many boxers (usually against their will) and persuading them to hire his associates as advisors.

Among his investments, James Norris held interests in the Rock Island Railroad, the Chicago Furniture Mart, and Chicago's Bismarck Hotel. Norris owned thoroughbred racehorses as well as Spring Hill Farm in Paris, Kentucky. His horses raced in the United States and in Canada where his colt, Rocky Royale, won the 1960 Canadian International Stakes. In 1938 his horse Danger Point, ridden by Eddie Arcaro, won the Metropolitan Handicap.

Like his father, Norris suffered from heart problems and had two heart attacks. He died in Chicago in 1966 at age 59, with a reported net worth of $250 million. Shortly before his death, Norris had arranged for an NHL franchise to be awarded to St. Louis, Missouri, even though no one from St. Louis applied for a franchise. Norris owned the St. Louis Arena.

Awards and achievements
1936, 1937, 1943, 1950, 1952 Stanley Cup (Detroit)

1961 Stanley Cup (Chicago)

See also 
 Tom Duggan

References

External links
 
 Picture of Norris' name on the Stanley Cup
 James Norris' obituary in the February 26, 1966 St. Petersburg Times
 The Mob, Murder Inc. and Madison Square Garden: Boxing's Tale of Corruption
 Jim Norris Is Part Of Boxing's Dirty Business
 A Bantam Confronts Norris
 Norris' Last Stand
 

1906 births
1966 deaths
United States Navy personnel of World War II
American racehorse owners and breeders
Chicago Blackhawks executives
Detroit Red Wings owners
Hockey Hall of Fame inductees
Lester Patrick Trophy recipients
National Hockey League executives
National Hockey League owners
Sportspeople from Chicago
Stanley Cup champions
20th-century American businesspeople
United States Navy officers
Military personnel from Illinois